Joseph Spencer (1790 – May 2, 1823) was an American lawyer and politician from New York.

Life
He was born in Hartford, Connecticut, the son of Isaac Spencer who was Connecticut State Treasurer from 1818 to 1835.

Joseph Spencer graduated from Yale College in 1811, then studied law, was admitted to the bar, and practiced in Rochester, New York. On September 24, 1814, he married Elizabeth Selden (b. 1797), a sister of Samuel L. Selden and Henry R. Selden. Their only child was Elizabeth Selden Spencer (b. 1819).

Spencer was a member of the New York State Senate (8th D.) in 1823, and died a few days after the end of the regular session of the Legislature in Albany, New York. His widow married Amos B. Eaton in 1831, and became the grandmother of Elizabeth Selden Rogers.

Sources
Hyde Genealogy by Reuben H. Walworth (1863; pg. 584)
The New York Civil List compiled by Franklin Benjamin Hough (pages 125 and 145; Weed, Parsons and Co., 1858)
Obit in The Washington Quarterly Magazine of Arts, Science and Literature edited by Robert Little (1823; Vol. 1; pg. 88)

1790 births
1823 deaths
Politicians from Hartford, Connecticut
Politicians from Rochester, New York
New York (state) state senators
19th-century American politicians
Lawyers from Rochester, New York
Yale College alumni
19th-century American lawyers